Cophixalus linnaeus is a species of frog in the family Microhylidae, the binomial honours Swedish botanist Carl Linnaeus. It is found in New Guinea.

References 

· Kraus, F. & A. Allison. 2009: New species of Cophixalus (Anura: Microhylidae) from Papua New Guinea. Zootaxa, 2128: 1–38.

linnaeus
Amphibians of New Guinea